Melocactus neryi is a species of flowering plant from the genus Melocactus.

References

neryi